Juan Guas (c. 1430-33 – c. 1496) was a Spanish artist and architect of French origin. He worked in a group of architects to create the Isabelline style. Born in Saint-Pol-de-Léon, he moved to Spain when he was young, and is often thought to have been Spanish. Among his notable buildings are:

Monasterio de San Juan de los Reyes, Toledo
Palacio del Infantado, Guadalajara
 Segovia Cathedral - Guas worked on the original cathedral and his cloister and part of his facade were transferred to the new site and rebuilt next to Hontañon's cathedral church a generation later.
 Castle of Belmonte.
 Colegio de San Gregorio
 Monastery of El Paular, Cloister.

References
Encyclopædia Britannica 

15th-century Spanish architects
15th-century French architects
Gothic architects
1430s births
1496 deaths
People from Finistère
15th-century Breton people